James Raymond Hughes is professor of comparative politics at the London School of Economics (LSE). Hughes' research interests relate to political violence and terrorism, secession, national and ethnic conflict in the former Soviet Union and the Balkans, and democratisation.

Education 
Hughes earned his BSc at Queen's University Belfast in 1982, and his PhD at the LSE (1982-7).

Selected publications

Books 
 
  Excerpt.

Chapters in books 
  Pdf.

Journal articles

References

External links
Jim Hughes personal webpage.

Academics of the London School of Economics
Living people
Year of birth missing (living people)
British political scientists
Alumni of Queen's University Belfast
Alumni of the London School of Economics